The following lists events that happened during 1917 in New Zealand.

Incumbents

Regal and viceregal
 Head of State – George V
 Governor – Arthur Foljambe, 2nd Earl of Liverpool, until 28 June
 Governor-General – Arthur Foljambe, 2nd Earl of Liverpool, from 28 June

Government
The 19th New Zealand Parliament continues as a grand coalition led by the Reform Party. The general election due this year is deferred because of World War I.
 Speaker of the House – Frederic Lang (Reform Party)
 Prime Minister – William Massey (Reform Party)
 Minister of Finance –  Joseph Ward

Parliamentary opposition
 Leader of the Opposition – Joseph Ward (Liberal Party). Ward retains the title even though he is part of the coalition government.

Judiciary
 Chief Justice – Sir Robert Stout

Main centre leaders
 Mayor of Auckland – James Gunson
 Mayor of Wellington – John Luke
 Mayor of Christchurch – Henry Holland
 Mayor of Dunedin – James Clark

Events 
 April – The first Caudron biplane purchased by Henry Wigram for the Canterbury Aviation Company arrives.
 1 May – The New Zealand Rifle Brigade (Earl of Liverpool's Own) is formed as the 3rd Brigade of the New Zealand Division, part of the New Zealand Expeditionary Force.
 7 May – Cecil McKenzie Hill makes the first flight for the Canterbury Aviation Company.
 June – Pilot training by the Canterbury Aviation Company commences at Sockburn. 
 24 September – Ten New Zealand are soldiers killed in England in the Bere Ferrers rail accident.
 20 October – 850 New Zealand are soldiers killed in the Second Battle of Passchendaele, the greatest loss of life in a single day in the military history of New Zealand.
 1 December – Six o’clock closing of hotel bars is introduced as a wartime measure.
Undated
 "Extraordinary and continuous rainfall" throughout the year causes "enormous damage to roads and bridges", and "the country became waterlogged", according to the Public Works Statement.
The West Coast Times, established in 1865, is merged into the Hokitika Guardian and Star.

Arts and literature

See 1917 in art, 1917 in literature, :Category:1917 books

Music

See: 1917 in music

Film

See: :Category:1917 film awards, 1917 in film, List of New Zealand feature films, Cinema of New Zealand, :Category:1917 films

Sport

Golf
 The New Zealand Open championship and National Amateur Championships are not held due to the war.

Horse racing

Harness racing
 New Zealand Trotting Cup – Adelaide Direct
 Auckland Trotting Cup – Steel Bell (2nd win)

Thoroughbred racing
 New Zealand Cup – Meelaus
 Auckland Cup – Fiery Cross
 Wellington Cup – Bunting
 New Zealand Derby – Estland

Lawn bowls
The national outdoor lawn bowls championships are held in Wellington.
 Men's singles champion – C.R. Ingram (Wellington Bowling Club)
 Men's pair champions – A. Sawyer, J.J. Martin (skip) (Turanganui Bowling Club)
 Men's fours champions – J.S. Ryrie, A.R. Coltman, W. Coltman, G.S. Osmond (skip) (Auckland Bowling Club)

Rugby union
 The Ranfurly Shield (held by ) is not contested as interprovincial matches are cancelled due to the war.

Soccer
 Provincial league champions:
 Auckland – Brotherhood
 Canterbury – Linwood
 Hawke's Bay – Waipukurau
 Otago – Northern
 Southland – No competition
 Wanganui – No competition
 Wellington – No competition

Births

January
 13 January – Doris Strachan, athlete
 19 January – Agnes Ell, cricketer
 20 January – Emily Carpenter, home science academic, adult educationalist, consumer advocate
 25 January – Rosalie Gascoigne, sculptor
 27 January – John Pattison, World War II pilot
 28 January – Jack Hatchard, association footballer
 31 January
 Erich Geiringer, writer, doctor, anti-nuclear weapons activist
 Frank Gill, air force officer, politician

February
 19 February
 Morrie McHugh, boxer, rugby union player
 Peg Taylor, cricketer
 26 February – Clyde Jeffery, politician, mayor of Napier (1974–83)

March
 1 March – Bill Sutton, artist
 9 March – Clarrie Gordon, boxer
 10 March  – Tom Pritchard, cricketer
 20 March – Haddon Donald, soldier, politician, sports shooter
 22 March – Phil Holloway, politician
 26 March – Ruth Gilbert, poet

April
 13 April – Bruce Ferguson, soldier
 18 April – Brian Mason, geochemistry, mineralogist, meteoriticist

May
 6 May – Roy Scott, cricketer
 21 May – Margaret Milne, potter
 22 May – Charlie Munro, jazz musician

June
 10 June – Jack Henry, industrialist
 11 June – Tom Davis, Cook Islands politician
 25 June – Nora Crawford, police officer

July
 1 July – Maurice Carter, property developer, politician, philanthropist
 6 July – Arthur Lydiard, runner, athletics coach
 7 July – John Crichton, furniture and interior designer
 13 July – Frank Carpay, ceramics, textile and graphic designer
 14 July – Doug Zohrab, public servant, diplomat
 19 July – Lewis Johnston, cricket umpire
 21 July – Jock Newall, association footballer
 23 July – Douglas Goodfellow, businessman, philanthropist
 27 July – Ron Meek. economist and social scientist
 31 July – Derek Ward, World War II pilot

August
 1 August – Esme Tombleson, politician
 3 August – Eddie Isbey, politician
 7 August – Arthur Cresswell, cricketer
 24 August – Ruth Park, writer

September
 2 September – Jack Scholes, sailor
 6 September – Cecil Hight, World War II pilot
 7 September – Ewen Solon, actor
 16 September – David Lewis, sailor, Polynesian scholar
 23 September – Wiremu Te Tau Huata, Anglican priest, military chaplain
 26 September – James Coe, artist, art teacher, industrial designer, ergonomist
 30 September – Denis Rogers, politician, mayor of Hamilton (1959–68)

October
 2 October – Rosaleen Norton, artist, occultist
 17 October
 Martin Donnelly, cricketer, rugby union player
 John Oswald Sanders, missionary
 18 October – Roy White, rugby union player
 31 October – Evan Mackie, World War II pilot

November
 6 November – Henry Walters, cricketer
 17 November – Tom Larkin, public servant, diplomat
 25 November – Paul Beadle, sculptor, medallist

December
 2 December – Betty Batham, marine biologist
 7 December – Bert Roth, librarian, historian
 8 December – Alan Stewart, rugby union player, university administrator
 11 December – Owen Snedden, Roman Catholic bishop
 12 December – Alan Deere, military pilot, author
 13 December – Keith Hay, construction company founder, politician, conservative activist
 24 December – Ronald Triner, road cyclist

Deaths

January–February
 3 February – Robert McNab, politician (born 1864)
 17 February
 Graham Gow, government trade representative (born 1850)
 Sir George McLean, politician (born 1834)
 22 February – Hugh Murray-Aynsley, politician (born 1828)

March–April
 6 March
 Tame Parata, politician (born 1837)
 William Salmond, Presbyterian minister, theologian (born 1835)
 11 March – William Hosking, doctor (born 1841)
 13 March – Percy Dix, vaudeville company manager (born 1866)
 27 March – Joseph Braithwaite, bookseller, politician, mayor of Dunedin (1905–06) (born 1848)
 30 March – Ferdinand Holm, mariner, ship owner (born 1844)
 23 April – Robert Bruce, politician, conservationist (born 1843)

May–June
 2 May – Alfred Lee Smith, politician (born 1838)
 7 June
 Bill Bussell, rugby league player (born 1887)
 George Sellars, rugby union player (born 1886)
 8 June
 George Bollinger, soldier, diarist (born 1890)
 Charles Henry Brown, military leader (born 1872)
 Thomas Culling, World War I flying ace (born 1896)
 22 June – John Lecky, rugby union player (born 1863)

July–August
 8 July – Alexander McKay, geologist (born 1841)
 14 July
 Robert Batley, storekeeper, sheep farmer (born 1849)
 Alexander Bruce, politician (born 1839)
 15 July – Bill Mackrell, rugby union and rugby league player (born 1881)
 23 July – James Gore, politician, mayor of Dunedin (1881–82) (born 1834)
 27 July – Arthur Brown, Mayor of Wellington
 30 July – William Baldwin, politician (born 1836)
 31 July – William Henry Dillon Bell, politician (born 1884)
 4 August
 Purakau Maika, newspaper editor and publisher (born 1852)
 Cecil Perry, cricketer (born 1846)
 5 August – Don Buck, gum digger (born 1869)
 6 August – Charles James, rugby league player (born 1891)
 7 August – Francis Earl Johnston, army officer (born 1871)
 14 August – William Sanders, naval officer, Victoria Cross recipient (born 1883)
 24 August – Alfred Kidd, politician, mayor of Auckland (1901–03) (born 1851)
 26 August – William Lane, journalist, utopian (born 1861)

September–October
 4 October – Dave Gallaher. rugby union player (born 1873)
 6 October – John Davies Ormond, politician (born 1831)
 12 October
 Henry Du Vall, rugby league player (born 1886)
 George Augustus King, military officer (born 1885)
 20 October – Elise Kemp, nurse (born 1881)
 22 October – Bob Fitzsimmons, boxer (born 1863)
 27 October – William Beehan, politician (born 1853)

November–December
 10 November – Charles King, cricketer (born 1847)
 13 November – Cecil Fitzroy, politician, mayor of Hastings (1894–99) (born 1844)
 15 November – Frank Twisleton, soldier, writer (born 1873)
 29 November – Ellen Greenwood, schoolteacher, social worker (born 1837)
 12 December – Sir Charles Bowen, politician (born 1830)
 14 December – George Wilson, cricketer (born 1887)
 23 December – Clive Franklyn Collett, World War I flying ace (born 1886)

See also
History of New Zealand
List of years in New Zealand
Military history of New Zealand
Timeline of New Zealand history
Timeline of New Zealand's links with Antarctica
Timeline of the New Zealand environment

References